LGBT culture in Portland, Oregon is an important part of Pacific Northwest culture.

History
 Portland vice scandal
 Burnside Triangle
 Jeannace June Freeman's murder of lesbian partner at Peter Skene Ogden State Scenic Viewpoint (1961)
 "Lesbian Roommate" obscenity trial
 Resolution Number 31510
 WomanShare and other lesbian land movements
 Ballot Measure 8 (1988), ruled unconstitutional in 1993
 1989 Hate Crimes Law
 Tanner vs OHSU domestic partner lawsuit, 1991
 1992 Springfield anti-equal-rights ballot measure passes
 1992 statewide anti-gay Measure 9 rejected
 1994 statewide anti-gay Measure 13 rejected
 2000 statewide anti-gay Measure 9 rejected
 2004 gay marriages briefly take place in Multnomah County, ruled illegal 2005
 2004 statewide constitutional Measure 36 gay marriage ban
 2007 statewide anti-discrimination bill
 2018 The City of Portland renames a 13-block stretch of Southwest Stark Street to commemorate Harvey Milk

Events 

Portland's annual pride parade is primarily organized by Pride Northwest. Peacock in the Park is another annual event, running from 1987 to 2005, and, again, from 2014 to the present. The La Femme Magnifique International Pageant is an annual drag pageant. Oaks Park Roller Skating Rink has hosted Gay Skate monthly for 30 years, as of 2021.

Queer Horror is an ongoing bi-monthly film festival that is shown at the Hollywood Theatre. The Portland Queer Film Festival, formerly known as the Portland Lesbian & Gay Film Festival, has been running for more than twenty years and takes place at Cinema 21. The Portland Queer Documentary Film Festival screens LGBTQ documentaries.

In 2011, Hands Across Hawthorne was organized in response to an attack on two men who were holding hands on the Hawthorne Bridge, with over 4,000 attendees.

LGBT establishments and nightlife

Current and planned

Currently operating LGBT drinking establishments and nightclubs include: CC Slaughters, Crush Bar, Eagle Portland, Santé Bar, Scandals (1979), Silverado, and Stag PDX (2015). Silverado and Stag are also strip clubs. Coffin Club (formerly Lovecraft Bar) has also been described as an LGBT-friendly bar. The Sports Bra, established in 2022, is an LGBTQ-owned bar focused on women's sports. Rebel Rebel is in Old Town Chinatown.

The drag venue Darcelle XV Showplace was established by Darcelle XV in 1967 and continues to host shows regularly. Other notable drag performers from Portland include Bolivia Carmichaels, Flawless Shade, and Poison Waters. 

Gay bathhouses operating in Portland include Hawks PDX (2012–present) and Steam Portland (since 2003). 

Monthly Blow Pony dances were established in Portland by Airick Redwolf in 2007. Inferno monthly dance parties hosted by Hot Flash Productions owner/operators DJ Wildfire (Jenn Davis) and Armida Hanlon that first began in Portland in 2004 and are now held regularly in Portland and Seattle. Portland also hosts Bearracuda dance events regularly. 

Shine Distillery and Grill has been described as a gay bar. The queer-owned vegan restaurant Mis Tacones was established as a pop-up restaurant in 2016 and relocated to a brick and mortar space in 2022. The queer-owned and operated Taqueria Los Puñales opened in 2020. 

Sissy Bar, an LGBTQ video bar, is slated to open in 2022. The lesbian bar Doc Marie's opened in 2022.

Former
Defunct establishments include Egyptian Club (1995–2010), Gail's Dirty Duck Tavern, Red Cap Garage (1987–2012), Starky's, and Three Sisters Tavern (1964–2004), which also operated as a strip club. The gay bathhouse Club Portland closed in 2007. Embers Avenue, established during the 1970s, and Escape Nightclub both closed in 2017. During the COVID-19 pandemic, Hobo's and Local Lounge closed in 2020 and 2021, respectively. In late 2021, Daniel Bund opened The Queen's Head, an English-style pub and lounge hosting drag shows and burlesque performances frequently. The bar closed in 2022.

The Roxy was an LGBT-friendly diner along Southwest Harvey Milk Street. The restaurant opened in 1994 and closed in March 2022. Sullivan's Gulch Bar & Grill (formerly known as Joq's Tavern, or simply Joq's) has also been described as an LGBT establishment.

Barbarella

Located at Northwest 5th Avenue and Davis Street in Old Town Chinatown, Barbarella (sometimes Barbarella PDX) was a nightclub in a building which previously housed a "grimy" music venue called Someday Lounge, followed by the Las Vegas-inspired Fifth Avenue Lounge. The bar was part of an Austin, Texas-based chain of nightclubs. Andrew Jankowski of Willamette Week described Barbarella as "a dance club with dirt-cheap drinks, themed parties running from the '50s through the '80s and an overall vibe best described as 'a straight person's idea of a gay bar.'"  He compared the bar to neighboring amusement arcade Ground Kontrol, but without the video games, and said, "Barbarella's aesthetic is as delightfully kitschy and low-budget as a bar named after a campy sci-fi cult classic should be." Jankowski wrote:On paper, Barbarella should be a sensation, particularly with central eastsiders who rarely deign to cross the river into the Old Town entertainment district. Sure, the lack of specialty drinks feels like a missed opportunity, and even the bartender recommended against ordering food. But with no cover charge and wells at or below $2 each, you'd imagine the place would be packed with people headed to or from the arcade bar, the gay strip club or the scores of other party spots in the neighborhood.Daily Xtra described Barbarella as a "video/dance dive bar" with dance parties, disc jockeys, and queer events in its 2019 overview of "gay Portland". The venue had two dance floors and a loft. The interior featured lava lamps, pinball machines, and mid-century modern furniture. There was a painting of a topless woman on one wall, as well as two "tributes" to Jane Fonda, who starred in the 1968 science fiction film Barbarella. According to Jankowski, "The only 21st-century features are the video projections and gently rippling rainbow LED lights behind the pre-existing sheet-metal grates."

Barbarella opened on February 14 (Valentine's Day), 2019, and closed during the COVID-19 pandemic. The venue had hosted Mac DeMarco.

Organizations 

LGBT rights organization Basic Rights Oregon is based in Portland. Local LGBT-oriented organizations include Cascade AIDS Project, Q Center, and Bradley Angle which offers LGBTQ domestic violence services. Others include:

 Amazon Dragons, a lesbian competitive dragon boat team, founded in 1992.
 Pride Northwest
 A Woman's Place bookstore
 Black Lesbians and Gays United
 Dykes on Bikes PDX
 Equity Foundation (merged with Pride Foundation)
 Gay and Lesbian Archives of the Pacific Northwest
 In Other Words Feminist Community Center
 Lesbian Community Project (1986–2008)
 Love Makes a Family (1992–?), closed
 Metropolitan Community Church
 Northwest Gender Alliance
 Oregon Bears
 Portland Association of Gay Equality
 Portland Gay Men's Chorus
 Portland Lesbian Choir 
 Q Center
 Right to Privacy / Right to Pride
 Second Foundation (1970–1972)
 Portland Sisters of Perpetual Indulgence
 Pride Northwest, annual pride parade organizers

Publications
LGBT publications have included Cascade Voice, Just Out, PQ Monthly, and The Eagle.

See also
 List of LGBT people from Portland, Oregon

References

External links
 Keeping It Queer in Portland on AfterEllen
 Oregon Gay History on Gay and Lesbian Archives of the Pacific Northwest